Marsan is a commune in the Gers department, southwestern France.

Geography

Population

There exists a Swedish vanilla sauce product called , the name inspired by a visit by the owner to Marsan, Gers in the 1920s.

See also
Communes of the Gers department

References

Communes of Gers